Dog River may refer to:

Canada
Dog River (Ontario), a river in Thunder Bay District, Ontario
Dog River (Manitoba), a river in Northern Region, Manitoba
Dog River, Saskatchewan, a fictional setting for the television series Corner Gas

United States
Dog River (Alabama), a tributary of Mobile Bay
Dog River (Georgia), a tributary of the Chattahoochee River
Dog River (Oregon), a tributary of the east branch of the Hood River
Hood River (Oregon), formerly known as Dog River

Other
Yellow Dog River
Dog Salmon River
Nahr al-Kalb, a river and gorge in Lebanon

See also
Dog (disambiguation)